Mount Houston is a community in north central Harris County, Texas. It is east of U.S. Highway 59, near the Dyersdale oil field.

Mount Houston was established along the Houston, East and West Texas Railway. A post office opened in 1910. In 1914 Mount Houston had 100 people. It featured several market gardeners. It included two churches, a sawmill, and a lumber company. The post office closed in 1918. By the 1980s Mount Houston did not significantly increase in size. Within  of Mount Houston, three schools and three churches had been established.

Education
Mount Houston is within the Houston Independent School District. North Forest High School is the sole zoned high school.

Until July 1, 2013, North Forest Independent School District was named the East and Mount Houston Independent School District.

References

 

Geography of Harris County, Texas